Cumberland Court House Historic District is a national historic district located at Cumberland, Cumberland County, Virginia. The district encompasses 111 contributing buildings, 5 contributing sites, and 8 contributing objects in the county seat of Cumberland County, Virginia.  It includes the governmental core of the village and the residential, commercial, educational, and religious resources that have grown up around the courthouse since Cumberland's designation as the county seat in 1777.  In addition to the separately listed Cumberland County Courthouse complex, notable buildings include Burleigh Hall (c. 1810), Woodlawn (c. 1800), Center Presbyterian Church (1852), Red Rose Inn, Stewart-Crockett House, All Saints Episcopal Church (c. 1890), Larkin Garrett House (1903), Flippen-Crawley House (1905), Joseph Carpenter House (1903), Masonic Lodge #283 (1903), and Payne Memorial United Methodist Church (1914).

It was listed on the National Register of Historic Places in 2007.

References

Historic districts on the National Register of Historic Places in Virginia
National Register of Historic Places in Cumberland County, Virginia
Federal architecture in Virginia
Greek Revival architecture in Virginia
Geography of Cumberland County, Virginia